Héctor Pulido Rodríguez (20 December 1942 – 18 February 2022) was a Mexican football player and manager who played as a midfielder. He played for the Mexico national team between 1967 and 1973, gaining 43 caps and scoring six goals. He was part of the Mexico squad for the 1970 FIFA World Cup.

Career
At club level, Pulido played for Cruz Azul and Club Jalisco.

After he retired from playing, Pulido became a manager of Cruz Azul in the 1986–87 Mexican Primera División season final against C.D. Guadalajara.

Personal life and death
Pulido died on 18 February 2022, at the age of 79.

Career statistics
Scores and results list Mexico's goal tally first, score column indicates score after each Pulido goal.

References

External links
 

DT Profile at Medio Tiempo

1942 births
2022 deaths
1970 FIFA World Cup players
Mexican expatriate footballers
Association football midfielders
Mexico international footballers
Cruz Azul footballers
Cruz Azul managers
Los Angeles Aztecs players
Footballers from Michoacán
Mexican footballers
People from La Piedad
Liga MX players
North American Soccer League (1968–1984) players
Expatriate soccer players in the United States
Mexican expatriate sportspeople in the United States
Pan American Games medalists in football
Pan American Games gold medalists for Mexico
Footballers at the 1967 Pan American Games
Mexican football managers
Medalists at the 1967 Pan American Games